Carolina Kasting Arruda (born 12 July 1975) is a Brazilian actress.

Biography 

At 14, she left school to study in Florianópolis the corps de ballet of the Teatro Guaira in Curitiba. Years later, interest in the theater made it to São Paulo to study drama and work on stage.

Career 
In 1996 she left the Rio de Janeiro to attend the workshop for actors of Rede Globo. Soon after, the debut novel Anjo de Mim, as the protagonist, and later, the show Malhação, which was a fake nun. After the premiere on TV, now split between the stage, where she makes sure to always act, and the successive roles on the small screen.

In 1997 starred in the remake of Anjo Mau, and also participated in the miniseries Hilda Furacão. The following year she moved to the Rede Manchete, Brida, and embodied in the soap opera of the same name, his only work outside the Globo.

In 1999 she returned to playing the evil Rosana, in Terra Nostra, she gained national recognition and praise from critics. Accumulated in issuing other memorable works, including the alcoholic Mariana Coração de Estudante, poor medical Laura Mulheres Apaixonadas, sweet Mariquinha Cabocla and the spirit of Laura in the remake of O Profeta.

In 2010 Judith played the villain of the novel Escrito nas Estrelas. In 2011, he was in the soap opera, O Astro, how sweet Jamile. In 2012, he was in Amor Eterno Amor, as the psychologist Beatriz. In 2013 live Gina, a girl from the outskirts of São Paulo in Amor à Vida, of Walcyr Carrasco.

In 2015, Carolina played Gilda Noronha, the mother of singer Mari, in Malhação Sonhos, and then introduced Rosa Ventana, a family cook, in Além do Tempo.
In 2018, she moved to Portugal to debut in the TVI fiction, integrating the cast of the novel Valor da Vida, with the character Camilla Vasconcelos, a successful businesswoman in the fashion business, but with a black past that made her rise in life (in which you want to hide it from everything and everyone).

In 2020, he returns to Rede Globo as the character Agnes in Salve-se Quem Puder, opposite Vitória Strada who plays his daughter Kyra.

Personal life
Sister of actress Rejane Arruda, 
Carolina is married to actor and designer Maurício Grecco, with whom she has two children, Cora and Tom.

Filmography

Television

Cinema

Theater 
1999 – Alice Através do Espelho.... Alice

References

External links 

1975 births
Living people
People from Florianópolis
Brazilian people of German descent
Brazilian people of Polish descent
Brazilian people of Italian descent
Brazilian people of Swiss-German descent
Brazilian telenovela actresses
Brazilian film actresses
Brazilian stage actresses